The Eiffel Tower is an iron lattice tower in Paris.

Eiffel Tower or EiffelTowers may also refer to:

Structures
 Eiffel Tower (Cedar Fair), two replicas at Cedar Fair amusement parks in Ohio and Virginia, USA
 Eiffel Tower (Paris, Tennessee), USA
 Eiffel Tower (Paris, Texas), USA
 Las Vegas Eiffel Tower, in Las Vegas, Nevada, USA; a replica of the tower in Paris
 Tour Eiffel Bridge (Eiffel Tower Bridge), Gatineau, Quebec, Canada

Other uses
 Eiffel Tower (Delaunay series), a cycle of paintings and drawings
 Eiffel Tower (shipwreck), a ship wrecked in south Wales in 1894
 Eiffel Tower, a slang term for a threesome wherein one horizontal person is attached to two vertical persons who are high-fiving, making an A-shape like an Eiffel Tower
 EiffelTowers Den Bosch (under this name: 2005-2013; est. 1952), or SPM Shoeters Den Bosch, a Dutch basketball club
 EiffelTowers Nijmegen (2000-2005), a Dutch basketball club which merged with Tulip Den Bosch

See also

 Tour Eiffel (disambiguation)), various items called "Tour Eiffel" in English
 Ramada Paris Tour Eiffel (Ramada Paris Eiffel Tower), a hotel
 Champ de Mars – Tour Eiffel station (Field of Mars - Eiffel Tower), Paris, France; a transit station
 List of songs about Paris, listing several songs named "Eiffel Tower"
 List of Eiffel Tower replicas
 Eiffel (disambiguation)
 Tower (disambiguation)